Rakuten TV is a video-on-demand (VOD) streaming service, listing movies and TV series for subscription, rental and purchase. It is owned by the Japanese company Rakuten. Rakuten TV's catalogue includes content from studios around the world, including Warner Bros., Disney, and Sony Pictures, local distributors, and independent labels, being the smallest and least known service among its competitors.

Rakuten TV's content can be streamed from most devices, offering a similar service to Netflix and other streaming services.

The company is headquartered in Barcelona and currently operates in several countries around Europe; Spain, United Kingdom, France, Germany, Italy, Sweden, Finland, Austria, Ireland, Belgium, Croatia, Netherlands, Luxembourg, Poland, Portugal, Ukraine and Switzerland.

In Japan, the video streaming service Rakuten SHOWTIME changed its name to Rakuten TV on July 1, 2017 and has been operating under the new name since then.

History
In June 2012, Rakuten, the world's third largest e-commerce company, acquired the company, previously known as Wuaki.tv. In July 2017, Wuaki.tv changed its name to Rakuten TV. Rakuten took over the user base from TalkTalk TV Store (previously Blinkbox) including migration of user purchased titles, in June 2018.

Rakuten Sports

On 11 June 2019, Rakuten announced the launch of Rakuten Sports, a new live streaming and video on demand (VOD) sports entertainment platform to expand and deliver sports content to several countries around the world, after eleven countries across Europe.

In November 2019, Rakuten Sports provides the subscription streaming coverage of Davis Cup for two seasons 2019 and 2020, also as the part of main sponsorship, starting from the 2019 finals.

References

Video on demand services
Video rental services
Internet properties established in 2010
Rakuten
Companies based in Barcelona
2010 establishments in Spain
2012 mergers and acquisitions
Internet technology companies of Spain